Gunta Stölzl (5 March 1897 – 22 April 1983) was a German textile artist who played a fundamental role in the development of the Bauhaus school's weaving workshop, where she created enormous change as it transitioned from individual pictorial works to modern industrial designs.  She was one of a small number of female teachers on the Bauhaus' staff and the first to hold the title of "Master".

Her textile work is thought to typify the distinctive style of Bauhaus textiles.  She joined the Bauhaus as a student in 1919, became a junior master in 1927.  She was dismissed for political reasons in 1931, two years before the Bauhaus closed under pressure from the Nazis.

The textile department was a neglected part of the Bauhaus when Stölzl began her career, and its active masters were weak on the technical aspects of textile production.  She soon became a mentor to other students and reopened the Bauhaus dye studios in 1921.  After a brief departure, Stölzl became the school's weaving director in 1925 when it relocated from Weimar to Dessau and expanded the department to increase its weaving and dyeing facilities.  She applied ideas from modern art to weaving, experimented with synthetic materials, and improved the department's technical instruction to include courses in mathematics.  The Bauhaus weaving workshop became one of its most successful facilities under her direction.

Early life

Stölzl was born in Munich, Bavaria.  She attended a high school for the daughters of professionals, graduating in 1913.  She began her studies at the Kunstgewerbeschule (School of Applied Arts) in 1914, where she studied glass painting, decorative arts and ceramics under the well known director Richard Riemerschmid.  In 1917 Stölzl's studies were interrupted by the ongoing war and she volunteered to work as a nurse for the Red Cross, behind the front lines until the end of World War I in 1918.  Upon her return home she re-immersed herself in her studies at the Kunstgewerbeschule in Munich, where she participated in the school's curriculum reform.  It was during this time that Stölzl encountered the Bauhaus manifesto.  Having decided to continue her studies at the newly formed Bauhaus school, Stölzl spent the summer of 1919 in the glass workshop and mural painting classes of the Bauhaus to earn her trial acceptance into Johannes Itten’s preliminary course.  By 1920, Stölzl had not only been fully accepted into the Bauhaus school, but had received a scholarship to attend.

Student life

Within Stölzl’s first year at the Bauhaus, she began what she referred to as the “women’s department”, which due to the underlying gender roles within the school, eventually became synonymous with the weaving workshop.  Stölzl was very active within the weaving department and was immediately seen as a leader among the pack.  At the time, the department was putting emphasis on artistic expression and individual works that reflected the teachings and philosophies of the painters who served as Bauhaus masters.  The Weimar Bauhaus had a very relaxed atmosphere that was almost wholly dependent on the students teaching themselves and one another.  Unfortunately, Georg Muche, who was the head of the weaving workshop at the time, had very little interest in the craft itself. He saw weaving and other textile arts as ‘women’s work’ and thus was of very little help with the technical processes involved.  This meant the students were left to their own devices to figure out all technical aspects of a craft most had little experience working in.  Due to this set-up, it is important to look at the Weimar era works visually as opposed to technically.

In 1921 Stölzl and two of her friends made a trip to Italy to view the art and architecture they had studied for further inspiration.  After passing her journeyman's examination as a weaver and taking courses in textile dyeing at a school in Krefeld, Stölzl was able to reopen the previously abandoned dye studios.  It was becoming obvious that she was giving direction to the other students, though unofficially,  as neither Muche, the form master nor Helene Börner, the crafts master, could really teach and promote the students in technical aspects. In 1921, Stölzl collaborated with Marcel Breuer on the African Chair - made of painted wood with a colorful textile weave.
The first official Bauhaus exhibition took place in September 1923 in the Haus am Horn building.  The building itself, primarily designed by Georg Muche, was a simplistic, highly modern cube structure made largely of steel and concrete.  Each room of the house was designed around its specific function and had specially made furniture, hardware etc., which had been produced in the Bauhaus workshops.  The weaving workshop participated by creating rugs, wall hangings and other objects for various rooms all of which won favorable reviews.  With this exhibition, Walter Gropius released an essay titled ‘Art and Technology – A New Unity' which seemed to have a great impact on the women of the weaving workshop.  Despite the favorable reviews of their works, the women began to move away from the pictorial imagery and traditional methods they had been working with up to this point and began working abstractly, attempting to make objects more in line with Kandinsky’s teachings of the ‘inner self’.

Bauhaus master

In April 1925, the Weimar Bauhaus closed and reopened in Dessau in 1926.  Stölzl, who had previously left the Bauhaus upon graduating to help Itten set up Ontos Weaving Workshops in Herrliberg, near Zurich, Switzerland, returned to become the weaving studio's technical director, replacing Helene Börner, and work with Georg Muche, who would remain the form master.  Although she was not officially made a junior master until 1927, it was clear both the organization and content of the workshop were under her control.  It was obvious from the start, the pairing of Muche and Stölzl was not enjoyed by either side, and resulted in Stölzl running the workshop almost single-handedly from 1926 onward.

The new Dessau campus was equipped with a greater variety of looms and much improved dyeing facilities, which allowed Stölzl to create a more structured environment.  Georg Muche brought in Jacquard looms to help intensify production.  He saw this as especially important now as the workshops were the school's main source of funding for the new Dessau Bauhaus.  The students rejected this and were not happy with the way Muche had used the school's funds.  This, among other smaller events, instigated a student uprising within the weaving department.  On March 31, 1927, despite some staff objections, Muche left the Bauhaus.  With his departure, Stölzl took over both as form master and master crafts person of the weaving studio.  She was assisted by many other key Bauhaus women, including Anni Albers, Otti Berger and Benita Otte.

Stölzl began trying to move weaving away from its ‘woman’s work’ connotations by applying the vocabulary used in modern art, moving weaving more and more in the direction of industrial design.  By 1928, the need for practical materials was highly stressed and experimentation with materials such as cellophane became more prominent.  Stölzl quickly developed a curriculum which emphasized the use of handlooms, training in the mechanics of weaving and dyeing, and taught classes in math and geometry, as well as more technical topics such as weave techniques and workshop instruction.  The earlier Bauhaus methods of artistic expression were quickly replaced by a design approach which emphasized simplicity and functionality.

Stölzl considered the workshop a place for experimentation and encouraged improvisation.  She and her students, especially Anni Albers, were very interested in the properties of a fabric and in synthetic fibers.  They tested materials for qualities such as color, texture, structure, resistance to wear, flexibility, light refraction and sound absorption.  Stölzl believed the challenge of weaving was to create an aesthetic that was appropriate to the properties of the material.  In 1930, Stölzl issued the first ever Bauhaus weaving workshop diplomas and set up the first joint project between the Bauhaus and the Berlin Polytex Textile company which wove and sold Bauhaus designs. 1In 1931 she published an article entitled “The Development of the Bauhaus Weaving Workshop”, in the Bauhaus Journal spring issue. Stölzl's ability to translate complex formal compositions into hand woven pieces combined with her skill of designing for machine production made her by far the best instructor the weaving workshop was to have.  Under Stölzl's direction, the weaving workshop became one of the most successful faculties of the Bauhaus.

Forced resignation

The school was constantly under attack as the Nazi Party gained more power, and the school's sacrifices to remain open were beginning to break its own ideology.  During Mies van der Rohe’s directorship there was intense pressure from the community for Stölzl to be let go.  Van der Rohe required her resignation in 1931, because of the surrounding Nazi atmosphere in Dessau, while Swastikas were painted on Stölzl's door.  The students were so opposed to this action that they dedicated an entire issue of the school newspaper to Stölzl. The Dessau campus of the Bauhaus was closed in 1932 by the Nazis, and the Bauhaus itself, which had moved from Dessau to Berlin, officially dissolved, by vote of the faculty, on 19 July 1933.

After the Bauhaus

After leaving the Bauhaus in 1931, Stölzl returned to Zurich where she and her partners Gertrud Preiswerk and Heinrich-Otto Hürlimann, also former Bauhaus students, created a private handweaving business called S-P-H Stoffe (S-P-H Fabrics).  The business floundered and closed soon after, in 1933, due to financial difficulties.  Stölzl became a member of the Schweizerischer Werkbund in 1932 and in 1934 "Das Werk", the Werkbund's official magazine, profiled her career.  It was also in 1934 that Stölzl received a major commission to make curtains for the Zurich cinema.  In 1935, Stölzl and her former partner Heinrich-Otto Hürlimann took another crack at business together and opened S&H Stoffe.  By 1937, Stölzl became the sole owner of Handweberei Flora (Hand Weaving Studio Flora) and had joined the Gesellschaft Schweizer Malerinnen, Bildhauerinnen und Kunstgewerblerinnen (Society of Swiss Women Painters, Sculptors and Craftswomen).  During the following decades, both the Museum of Modern Art in New York and the Busch-Reisinger Museum in Cambridge, Massachusetts acquired pieces of Stölzl's work while she continued to work at her hand weaving business, creating mainly textiles for interior design.  In 1967 Stölzl dissolved her business and devoted all her time to tapestry weaving, a large shift in focus.  It was also in 1967 that the Victoria and Albert Museum acquired her designs and samples, resulting in major national and international collections.

Stölzl died in 1983 in Zurich.

The Galerie Raphael Durazzo is organising an exhibition entitled "The Bauhaus Prism" with works by Gunta Stölzl in 2022. It is the first French gallery to hold an exhibition with several of her works.

There is a street named after Stölzl in Munich, Germany.

Timeline

1914-1916 Studies glass painting, ceramics and decorative painting at the Kunstgewerbeschule (School of Applied Arts) in Munich
1917-1918 Works as a Red Cross Nurse behind the front lines
1919 Continues studies at Kunstgewerbeschule in Munich, participates in curriculum reform.  Encounters Bauhaus manifesto.
1919-1923 Studies at the Bauhaus school with Itten, Klee and Kandinsky.
1922 Attends a course in dyeing techniques in Krefeld and establishes dyeing facilities at the Bauhaus
1923 Passes journeyman's exam; continues working in the weaving workshop.
1924 Helps Itten establish Ontos Weaving Workshops near Zurich
1925 Assumes position of technical director at Dessau weaving workshop, directs her students' practical and theoretical studies.
1927 Appointed as Jungmeister (Junior Master) for the entire weaving workshop, the Bauhaus’ first and only female master.
1927 Experiments with new materials such as cellophane and ‘iron yarn’, and begins to attempt jacquard weaving.
1929 Marries the Israeli architecture student Arieh Sharon and loses German citizenship.  Daughter Yael born.
1930 First diplomas of the Bauhaus weaving workshop are issued by Stölzl.
1931 Publishes ‘Development of the Bauhaus Weaving Workshop’
1931 Forced to resign as director of the weaving workshop.  Emigrates to Switzerland and forms a private hand weaving business in Zurich, S-P-H Stoffe with Gertrud Preiswerk and Heinrich-Otto Hürlimann.
1932 Becomes a member of the Swiss Werkbund.
1933 SPH Stoffe Dissolves due to financial difficulties.
1934 Receives commission for curtains for the Cinema Urban, Zurich.  Das Werk magazine profiles her career.
1935 Partnership with Hürlimann to form S&H Stoffe.
1936 Stölzl and Sharon divorce.
1937 Becomes sole owner of Handweberei Flora (Hand Weaving Studio Flora). Joins the Gesellschaft Schweizer Malerinnen, Bildhauerinnen und Kunstgewerblerinnen (Society of Swiss Women Painters, Sculptors and Craftswomen)
1941 Participates in the interior of the Swiss pavilion, Lyon.
1942 Marries Willy Stadler, becomes a Swiss citizen
1943 Birth of second daughter, Monika, in Zurich
1949-1963 Busch-Reisinger Museum and MoMA acquire works by Stölzl
1967-69 Dissolves hand weaving business, devotes herself to tapestry and weaving her own designs. the Victoria and Albert Museum acquires designs and fabric samples; major national and international collections.
1983 Dies April 22, 1983 in Zurich at the age of 86.

See also
Bauhaus
Weaving
Fiber art
Anni Albers
Margaretha Reichardt
Otti Berger
Friedl Dicker-Brandeis
Georg Muche
Johannes Itten
Marcel Breuer
Margaret Leischner
Paul Klee
Wassily Kandinsky

Notes

References
Bayer, Herbert, Walter Gropius and Ise Gropius, eds. 1900-Bauhaus 1919-1928.  Boston, MA, USA: Charles T. Branford Company, 1959.
Whitford, Frank. Bauhaus. London:Thames and Hudson Ltd.:1984.

External links

Gunta Stölzl Estate - Extensive Official Site
Bauhaus Kooperation: Stölzl's search
Museum of Modern Art, Stölzl's Online Collection
Harvard Art Museums, Stölzl's Online Collection
Metropolitan Museum, Stölzl's Online Collection
Getty Record, Gunta Stölzl
Cooper Hewitt, Stölzl's Online Collection

1897 births
1983 deaths
Bauhaus alumni
Academic staff of the Bauhaus
German art educators
20th-century German artists
German weavers
Textile artists
German women artists
Artists from Munich
People from the Kingdom of Bavaria
Women textile artists
German textile artists
20th-century German women